Alfred Klausnitzer (4 July 1900 – 30 December 1958) was a Czech fencer. He competed for Czechoslovakia in the team épée event at the 1936 Summer Olympics.

References

External links
 
 

1900 births
1958 deaths
Czech male fencers
Czechoslovak male fencers
Olympic fencers of Czechoslovakia
Fencers at the 1936 Summer Olympics